High School Possession is a 2014 American thriller film directed by Peter Sullivan. The film stars Janel Parrish, Jennifer Stone, Shanley Caswell, Ione Skye, and Kelly Hu. It premiered on Lifetime on October 25, 2014.

Plot
Lauren, an editor at her high school newspaper, believes her best friend is possessed and tries to get a reverend to conduct an exorcism on her. When he refuses, Lauren takes matters into her own hands to get the ritual performed.

Cast
 Janel Parrish as Lauren Brady
 Jennifer Stone as Chloe Mitchell
 Shanley Caswell as Olivia Marks
 Ione Skye as Bonnie Mitchell
 Kelly Hu as Denise Brady
 William McNamara as Reverend Young
 Chris Brochu as Mase Adkins
 Maya Stojan as Emma

References

External links
 
 

2014 television films
2014 films
2014 thriller films
Lifetime (TV network) films
American thriller television films
2010s English-language films
2010s American films